The  is a dam in the city of Gero, Gifu Prefecture, Japan on the Maze River, part of the Kiso River system. The dam is a rockfill dam with a height of 127 meters and was constructed as a multipurpose dam for flood control,  supply of municipal and industrial water, irrigation water and hydroelectric power generation. The reservoir created by the dam supplies the Chubu Electric Power Company's Mazegawa No.1 Power plant with a capacity of 288 MW hydroelectric power station.

157 households were flooded during the construction of the dam.

References

Dams in Gifu Prefecture
Hydroelectric power stations in Japan
Dams completed in 1976
Embankment dams
Energy infrastructure completed in 1976
Gero, Gifu